Waheed Murad (2 October 1938 – 23 November 1983), also known as Chocolate Hero, was a Pakistani film actor, producer and script writer. Famous for his charming expressions, attractive personality, tender voice and unusual talent for acting, Waheed is considered one of the most famous and influential actors of South Asia
 and has influenced the film industry in the subcontinent.

Born in Sialkot, Pakistan, he graduated from the S.M. Arts College Karachi, and then earned a master's degree in English literature from University of Karachi. He started his film career in a cameo in 1959 in the film Saathi when he was 21 years old. One of his films, Armaan, which was produced by him, was a great success. Murad is the only actor of film industry to secure the highest number of platinum, diamond, golden and silver jubilees. He mesmerized Pakistani nation during 1960s and 1970s more than anyone before or after and is considered to be evergreen chocolate hero of Pakistan's silver screen history. He acted in 125 feature films and earned 32 film awards.

In November 2010, 27 years after his death, the Pakistani President Asif Ali Zardari posthumously awarded him the Sitara-e-Imtiaz, the third highest honour and civilian award by the State of Pakistan, given in the fields of literature, arts, sports, medicine, or science.
 On 2 October 2019, Google celebrated Murad's 81st birthday with a doodle on its homepage for Pakistan, India, Nepal and several other countries.
In 2022, song Ko Ko Korina which was picturised on him in 1966, featured in the opening scene of American series Ms. Marvel (TV series) and won top ratings.

Early life 
Murad was an only child. His mother was Shireen Murad, and his father was Nisar Murad, a film distributor. He did graduation from S.M. Arts College, Karachi, and then masters in English literature from University of Karachi. His father was a Punjabi whose family belonged to the cultural elite of Sialkot. The Murads claimed Turkish ancestry; one of their ancestors, Murat, was a soldier of Ottoman-origin serving in the Mughal army who settled in Punjab.

Film career 

Waheed Murad started his film career by joining his father's established 'Film Art' in 1961 as producer of the film Insaan badalta hai. In his second film as producer Jab se dakha hai tumhein he cast Darpan with Zeba as heroine. Afterwards, Darpan most of the time started coming late at studio. Zeba suggested Waheed to cast himself as hero in his next film. Waheed was not ready to sign himself in his own movies. But when the same suggestion came from his old good friend Pervaiz Malik, he accepted it on the condition that if Zeba would be his co-star, Zeba accepted in return (according to Zeba). As a result, he firstly appeared in a supporting role in 1962's Aulad.  The film was directed by his friend S.M. Yousuf.  Aulad got much more acclaims from critics, and it also got the Nigar award in the best film's category for the year. Heera aur pathar was his first movie as a leading actor. He got the Nigar award in the best actor category for the same film.

In 1966, he produced and acted in Armaan. The film broke all the box office records at that time and completed 75 weeks in theatres. The film were sung by Ahmed Rushdi. Murad received two Nigar awards for the categories best producer and best actor for the film.

In 1967, he appeared as the leading actor in films like Devar bhabi, Doraha, Insaaniyat and Maan baap.
From 1964 to 1968, Murad and Pervaiz Malik made Heera Aur Pathar, Armaan, Ehsaan, Doraha and Jahan tum wahan hum. The combination of Waheed Murad, Pervaiz Malik, Masroor Anwar, Sohail Rana, Ahmed Rushdi and Zeba created a number of films. Waheed Murad brought Malik, Anwar and Rana under the umbrella of 'Film Arts'. Film Arts broke up and Pervaiz Malik started creating his own projects with new actors. A total of seven films, including two films, i.e., Usey dekha usey chaha and Dushman released after a long gap of 6 years in 1974, were produced with the combination of Waheed and Pervaiz (but not under 'Film Art' Production).

In 1969, Waheed produced, wrote and directed the movie Ishaara. It was released in 1969. Other co-stars included Shabnam, Rozina, Aliya, Talish and Mustafa Qureshi. Murad received a Nigar award in the best actor category for the film.

In his 25-year career, Murad paired with many actresses like Zeba, Shamim Ara, Rani, Naghma, Aaliya, Sangeeta, Kaveeta, Aasia, Shabnam, Deeba, Babra Sharif, Rukhsana, Bahar Begum and Neelo. He acted in a total of 124 films (two were released after his death), of which 38 were black and white and 86 were in colour. He also appeared in six films as a guest star including his first and shortest appearance in 1959's Saathi. He acted in 115 Urdu films, 8 Punjabi films and 1 Pushto film, and earned 32 film awards including ones for best producer and for best actor.

Film Art productions 
Waheed Murad produced eleven films under his father's company Film Art. He was the youngest film producer in the Pakistani film industry at that time. Most of his produced films were either Golden Jubilee or Silver Jubilee. During the 1960s and early 1970s, he produced films like Insaan Badalta Hai (1961) (his first film as producer), Armaan (1966), Ehsaan (1967), Naseeb Apna Apna (1970) and Mastana Mahi (Punjabi film of 1971). However, after Mastana Mahi, he produced no film except Hero which was produced in the 1980s and was released after his death.

As a director, he had directed as well as produced Ishaara (1969) with co-star Deeba.

Playback singers

In Waheed's career, most of the songs picturised by him were sung by Ahmed Rushdi. He sang more than 200 duet and solo songs for him. Other playback singers who provided voice for him were Mehdi Hassan, Masood Rana, Saleem Raza, Akhlaq Ahmed, Mujeeb Aalam, Asad Amanat Ali Khan, Bashir Ahmad, Ustad Amanat Ali Khan and A Nayyar.

In August 2018, Coke Studio produced a remake of Ahmed Rushdi's first South Asian pop song "Ko Ko Korina", originally lip-sync by Waheed Murad in the 1966 film Armaan, in the voices of Mustehsan and Ahad Raza Mir. Their rendition of this Pakistani classic was widely criticized. Within a few days of the video being released on YouTube, it became the most-disliked video in the music show's 11-year history. Waheed Murad's son Adil Murad also reacted to the outcry by apologizing to the song's fans for the controversial remake.

Later life 
By the late 1970s, Waheed was being cast in supporting roles either with Nadeem or with Mohammad Ali. Most of the leading heroines like Zeba, Shabnam and Nisho were not allowed to play lead roles with Waheed by their husbands. Pervaiz Malik wrote in a local newspaper: "Not even once during that time [did] Waheed come to me seeking work in my films.  Waheed was becoming depressed. His close friends revealed that he was becoming addicted to alcohol, oral tobacco and sleeping pills. Even his domestic life suffered and his wife Salma left for the United States. A combination of bad habits and stress caused ulceration in Waheed's stomach in 1981. He suffered from bleeding and had to undergo stomach removal to save his life. His many fans came to the hospital to donate blood to save the life of their favourite hero. Although, he recovered, he lost a significant amount of weight. Even then, Iqbal Akhtar and Iqbal Yousuf, who proved to be real friends in difficult times, cast Waheed Murad in their movies. Waheed appeared old and charmless in Dil ney phir yaad keya and Ghairao. Even his loyal admirers felt that it was all over for him."

In 1983, Anwar Maqsood, a TV writer and anchor and a close friend, invited Waheed to his TV comedy show Silver Jubilee.

Babra Sharif, revealed that during the filming of a scene of Hero, Waheed lost his balance while walking toward her and fell down. He took several minutes to catch his breath prior to standing up on his feet again.

In July 1983, Waheed was driving his car too fast and struck a tree. He was left with a scar on his face. A few days after the accident, Waheed asked his friend Pervez Malik for a role. Malik said, "Get better and you will be the lead in my next film." He replied, "You give me the role and I will get better". He was going to Karachi to get the scar fixed to complete the last few scenes of Hero when he met the chief editor, Ilyas Rasheedi, of the film magazine 'Nigar' at the airport. Rasheedi wrote in his magazine:
By chance a famous film producer was also present in the waiting area and Waheed put him on the spot by asking if he had a role for him for Javed Sheikh's father in his movie. The producer had a difficult time dodging Waheed.

Last days and death 
Waheed's son Aadil was in Karachi staying with his grandmother. A day before his face surgery, Waheed celebrated his son's birthday. He bought several gifts for Aadil and wished him a happy year. 

He returned late to spend the night at Anita Ayub's mother Mumtaz Ayub's home. When Waheed did not wake up until late, the door had to be forced open and Waheed was found lying on the floor, dead for several hours. A paan leaf with an unidentified substance in it was found in his mouth. It is not clear if the cause of death was a heart attack or suicide. Waheed was buried near his father's grave in Gulberg Graveyard in Lahore.

Personal life 
Waheed Murad married Salma, the daughter of a Karachi-based industrialist, on 17 September 1964. They had two daughters, Aaliya and Sadia, and one son, (Adil). Sadia died in infancy.

Awards and honours 

On 2 October 2019, Google celebrated Murad's 81st birthday with a doodle on its homepage for Pakistan. At PTV Awards in 2012 on June 11th at 17th PTV Awards tributes were paid to him and he was awarded PTV Pakistani Legend Award which was given to his son Adil Murad. The Government of Pakistan named a street and intersection after him in Lahore on August 16th, 2021.

Filmography

References

External links
 
  (now discontinued)
 Biography of Waheed Murad
 Waheed Murad Remembered

 
1938 births
1983 deaths
Punjabi people
Nigar Award winners
Pakistani male film actors
Pakistani film directors
Pakistani film producers
Pakistani screenwriters
20th-century Pakistani male singers
Pakistani people of Turkish descent
Male actors from Karachi
University of Karachi alumni
Karachi Grammar School alumni
20th-century Pakistani male actors
Lawrence College Ghora Gali alumni
Recipients of Sitara-i-Imtiaz
Male actors in Urdu cinema
PTV Award winners
Male actors in Punjabi cinema
20th-century screenwriters